Samvel is a name. It may refer to:

Samvel Babayan (born 1965), leader of the Dashink political party in Artsakh
Samvel Darbinyan, Armenian football coach
Samvel Gasparov (born 1938), Soviet/Russian film director and short story writer
Samvel Karapetian, Armenian historian, researcher, and architecture expert
Samvel Melkonyan (born 1984), Armenian football midfielder
Samvel Petrosyan, Armenian football manager
Samvel Shoukourian (born 1950), computer scientist, academician of NAS RA
Samvel Tumanyan (born 1949), Armenian politician
Samvel Yervinyan (born 1966), musician and composer

See also
Samuel (name)

Armenian masculine given names